Once a leading hotel in downtown Richmond, Virginia, the Hotel Richmond overlooks the Thomas Jefferson designed State Capitol in Capitol Square. One of the rare gilded-age hotels built by a woman entrepreneur, the Hotel Richmond is now owned by the Commonwealth of Virginia, which uses it as its Barbara Johns Building, currently housing the Office of the Attorney General.

History

The Hotel Richmond was built in 1904 by entrepreneuse Adeline Detroit Wood Atkinson, with first phase by Harrison Albright and second by John Kevan Peebles, the latter architect of the wings of Virginia's State Capitol on Capitol Square. It sits across Grace Street from St. Paul's Church, and next to St. Peter's Church. It sits on the site of the St. Clare Hotel, which was demolished for the new hotel.

Mrs. Atkinson ran the Lexington Hotel at 13th and Main Streets. Atkinson, a Bedford County native, came to Richmond from Lynchburg, Virginia with her husband. On his death, she took over the business. By all accounts she was a feisty woman, making sure that hotels were taxed fairly, instead of favoring the Jefferson Hotel. If not, she threatened to locate in another city where "taxes were not so high." At the time, the Richmond Times-Dispatch called her the "personification of energy, industry and luck. Her business hours are from sunrise to sunrise" and is "tireless as a swallow on the wing."

Her energy got her into trouble as she bucked the city establishment. The Times-Dispatch on April 26, 1903, said that during her attempt to build the Hotel Richmond, she threatened to leave the city if she was not taxed at a more equitable rate for her Lexington as compared to the Murphy Hotel and the Jefferson Hotel. Indeed, she would not build the Hotel Richmond until she felt she was taxed at a more fair rate. She told the papers that: "I feel that I am being discriminated against because I am a woman, but if I am not wanted here, I can easily go somewhere else." The Richmond News Leader reported April 29, 1903 that she was "fuming and fretting" because of a high license fee that was to be placed on the hotel. Her issues with the city were not all about being a woman: she also stridently defended her use of "colored" men to do some of the excavation work.

The May 9, 1903 demolition that preceded the building of the Hotel Richmond was newsworthy. A neighboring house, home of the Catholic bishop, was damaged just as the demolition of the old hotel began. Miraculously, A picture of the Christ child survived "alone and uninjured" when the demolition of the St. Clare accidentally went awry.

Further additions were made by John Kevan Peebles, architect of the wings of the State Capitol, and were done in preparation for the 1907 300th anniversary of the founding of Virginia; obviously, the two were meant to be part of a whole look for Capitol Square.

On its construction it became one of many distinguished hotels in downtown Richmond that operated in the early part of the 20th century, including the Jefferson Hotel, Hotel Rueger, Murphy's Hotel, Hotel John Marshall and William Byrd Hotel.  During the 1940s and 50s, it housed the studios of Richmond's top AM radio station, 1140 WRVA, and in 1948, it was joined by co-owned FM 94.5 WRVB (now WRVQ).

Social History

As the largest hotel immediately adjacent to Richmond's Capitol Square, the hotel had a central place in the political history of the city. For decades, it was the home to the Byrd Machine. Today, it serves as the Office of the Attorney General.

The hotel's mezzanine housed WRVA, Richmond's pioneering AM 50,000 watt radio station. The hotels were the center of social life in downtown Richmond for most of their history. The Hotel Richmond's mezzanine was the headquarters of WRVA Radio, which was known throughout the Eastern U.S. for its pioneering radio broadcasts. In 1940, the station began airing the famed variety show Sunshine Sue and Her Rangers, which swept the eastern U.S. with its country music. Other shows reflected a local twist, including Corn Cob Pipe Club and Capitol Squirrel. The shows that were born in the building were ubiquitous nationally and not just locally; for instance the Corn Cob show had hundreds of clubs in the U.S. and Canada.

The hotel was the center of politics. Early in its life it was festooned with a Westmoreland Davis for Governor banner, and sometime in the early 19th century, it became headquarters for the state's Democratic party, with offices in the hotel's historic Parlor A. From the ballroom in 1926, the first Harry Byrd took control of the state with his famed Byrd Machine. At his inauguration party on the hotel's roof garden, he addressed the state on WRVA. In 1933, Gov. William M. Tuck set up an office in the building, and it was there Harry Byrd took over the seat of his father. It was, according to historian Jim Latimer, the room with the best view of the State Capitol and Executive Mansion. From the room, the final five Byrd governors (Battle, Stanley, J. Lindsay Almond, Albertis Harrison and Mills Godwin) ran their successful campaigns, such was the room's mystique. In the 1970s, the building was the site of the state's tourism marketing efforts including the historic "Virginia Is For Lovers" campaign.

Renovation

The hotel was renovated in 2016 by the Commonwealth of Virginia, which relocated the Attorney General's office into the refurbished hotel from the nearby Pocohantas Building. It had previously been under threat of demolition. Richmond-based Commonwealth Architects is leading plans for the entire block. In the current plan, the old Murphy Hotel will be razed for parking and office space. Some scenes for Steven Spielberg's movie Lincoln were filmed in the building.

References

External links
 Historic Richmond Statement on Preservation
 Article on Mrs. Atkinson
 Va. General Services Dept. Historic Info
 Statement on Preservation Options by Richmond's Alliance to Conserve Old Richmond Neighborhoods

Hotel buildings on the National Register of Historic Places in Virginia
Hotels in Richmond, Virginia
Hotels established in 1904
Hotel buildings completed in 1904
Hotel Richmond